The Men in Black is an American comic book created and written by Lowell Cunningham, illustrated by Sandy Carruthers, and originally published by Aircel Comics. Aircel would later be bought out by Malibu Comics, which itself was bought out by Marvel Comics. Three issues were published in 1990, with another three the following year. It was adapted into the film Men in Black, which was a critical and commercial success, leading to three sequels and various spin-offs, as well as a number of tie-in one-shot comics from Marvel. Cunningham had the idea for the comic once a friend of his introduced him to the concept of government "men in black" upon seeing a black van riding the streets.

Publication history
The first series consisted of three issues and was published in 1990 by Aircel Comics, cover-dated January to March 1990. After Aircel was acquired by Malibu Comics, a second series appeared, The Men in Black Book II #1-3 (May–July 1991).

Malibu was purchased by Marvel Comics in 1994, and when the feature film Men in Black was released, Marvel published a number of one-shots in 1997, including a reboot of the original comic line, a sequel, a movie adaptation, and a reprint of the first issue of the original Aircel miniseries.<ref>[http://comicbookdb.com/issue.php?ID=29889 Men in Black: American Entertainment Exclusive] at Comic Book DB</ref>

The first series was collected into a trade paperback (June 1990).

Plot

The Men in Black is an international intelligence organization which oversees and investigates both good and evil paranormal activity on Earth. Their remit includes alien life, demons, mutants, zombies, werewolves, vampires, legendary creatures and other paranormal beings. In order to keep their investigations secret, much of the global population are unaware of their activities, and are liable to be neuralyzed to blank their memory of any interaction with the agents or phenomena connected to them.

Notable members include Zed, Jay, Kay and Ecks. Ecks later becomes a rogue agent after learning that the MIB seeks to keep the supernatural hidden in order to manipulate and reshape the world in their own image.

An agent may use any means necessary, including death and destruction, to accomplish a mission. Agents sever all ties with their former lives, and (thanks to the neuralyzer) as far as the world is concerned, they do not exist.

 Adaptations 

Beginning with the release of the film Men in Black in 1997, the comic book has been adapted across a wide variety of media, spawning an entire franchise. Starring Will Smith and Tommy Lee Jones, the film proved a huge box office success for Columbia Pictures and Amblin Entertainment, resulting in two sequels: Men in Black II and Men in Black 3. The popularity of the films subsequently led to many tie-ins and spin-offs, including an animated series, novelizations, soundtracks of each film, video games, and a theme park attraction. A spin-off was released in 2019, titled Men in Black: International''. It continues the universe of the first three films, instead of adapting the original material from the comic book.

Despite sharing the same basic premise, the various adaptations differ greatly from the original comics. Some of these differences include:

 The secret organization exclusively polices extraterrestrial activity on Earth, omitting the other paranormal elements.
 The agency uses memory erasure, rather than killing witnesses.
 The agency's main goal is to maintain order on Earth, rather than to direct it.
 Zed physically appears, rather than being an unseen character.
 Ecks is absent in the film, and is replaced by Dr. Laurel Weaver (later Agent L).
 Agent J is an African-American man, instead of a blonde-haired white man.
 The tone of the series was lightened, exchanging the comics' dark and bleak approach for comedy.

References

External links

The Men in Black at Don Markstein's Toonopedia. Archived from the original on February 17, 2016.

Men in Black (comics)
1990 comics debuts
1990 comics endings
1991 comics debuts
1991 comics endings
Aircel Comics titles
Malibu Comics titles
Marvel Comics titles
American comics adapted into films
Fictional government investigations of the paranormal
Fictional intelligence agencies
Fictional secret societies
Science fiction comics
Spy comics
Comics characters introduced in 1990
Comics about extraterrestrial life